Partha Pratim Mitra, Ph.D. is an Indian-American neuroscientist and computer scientist. He is the Crick-Clay Professor of Bioinformatics at Cold Spring Harbor Laboratory. Mitra currently holds the H.N. Mahabala Distinguished Chair in Computational Brain Research at IIT Madras and he is a Senior Visiting Researcher at RIKEN, Tokyo, Japan.

Biography
Partha Mitra received his PhD in theoretical physics from Harvard University under the guidance of Bertrand Halperin in 1993. He worked in quantitative neuroscience and theoretical engineering at Bell Laboratories from 1993-2003 and as an Assistant Professor in Theoretical Physics at Caltech from 1996 before moving to Cold Spring Harbor Laboratory in 2003 where he is a Crick-Clay professor of biomathematics. Professor Mitra also holds adjunct positions in the NYU School of Medicine and Weill Cornell Medical College.

Research
Mitra's research aims to study the complex biological systems from a “theoretical engineering” perspective. He combines theoretical, computational and experimental approaches and currently understanding how brains work. Professor Mitra initiated the idea of brain-wide mesoscale circuit mapping and founded the Brain Architecture Project in collaboration with RIKEN Brain Science Institute and Monash University. He has published over 240 research articles in peer reviewed journals such as Nature, Science, PNAS, PRL and holds eight U.S. patents. He has also co-authored a book titled Observed Brain Dynamics published by the Oxford University Press

References

Year of birth missing (living people)
Living people
Fellows of the American Physical Society
Harvard University alumni
Indian neuroscientists
American neuroscientists
Fellow Members of the IEEE